Karmrashen may refer to:
Karmrashen, Vayots Dzor, a village in Vayots Dzor, Armenia.
Karmrashen, Aragatsotn, a village in Aragatsotn, Armenia.
Karmrashen (former village), an abandoned village in Aragatsotn, Armenia.
Karakert, a village in Armavir, Armenia, formerly known as Karmrashen.
Khrber: ruins of a medieval fortified town also known as Karmrashen in Gegharkunik, Armenia.